District 28 of the Oregon State Senate comprises all of Crook and Klamath counties, as well as parts of Deschutes, Jackson, and Lake counties. It is currently represented by Republican Dennis Linthicum of Bonanza.

Election results
District boundaries have changed over time, therefore, senators before 2013 may not represent the same constituency as today. From 1993 until 2003 it covered parts of north-central and eastern Oregon, and from 2003 until 2013 it covered a slightly different area in south-central Oregon.

References

28
Crook County, Oregon
Deschutes County, Oregon
Klamath County, Oregon
Jackson County, Oregon
Lake County, Oregon